Mozac Abbey is a former Cluniac monastery in the commune of Mozac near Riom in Auvergne, France.

History 

A monastery was founded here in either 533 or 680 by Saint Calminius (Saint Calmin) and his wife, Saint Namadia. Calminius is said to have given the new monastery relics of Saint Peter, to whom the foundation was dedicated, and of Saint Caprasius of Agen, brought from Agen, of which there has long been no trace. From "King Pepin", either Pepin the Short in 764 or Pepin II of Aquitaine in 848, the monastery received the relics of Saint Austremonius, first bishop of Clermont and responsible for the evangelisation of the Auvergne; the abbey passed under royal protection. These have survived until today and are preserved in a painted wooden casket of the sixteenth century. The chasse reliquary of Calminius, or Saint Calmin, is one of the outstanding masterpieces of Limoges enamel.

In 1095 Pope Urban II launched the First Crusade at the Council of Clermont and at the same time affiliated Mozac to the Cluniac Order; nevertheless, Mozac was able to retain some of its independence, as it remained an abbey rather than becoming a dependent priory, as were most of Cluny's affiliated houses. 

The abbey was rebuilt in the early twelfth century. The buildings were severely damaged and largely destroyed in a series of earthquakes between 1477 and 1490, and among the few remains  of the Romanesque architecture that have survived are carved Romanesque capitals (illustration) that were particularly noted by Prosper Mérimée in the first assessment of medieval monuments in France: "What renders the church of Mozat [sic] particularly interesting are its capitals, which, for the merit of their execution, may be compared to the best of Brioude". The rebuilding was carried out in the Gothic style, using the harder Volvic stone instead of the limestone of the earlier constructions.

From 1516 Mozac was ruled by commendatory abbots who were not in residence. In 1790 the abbey was dissolved in the French Revolution. The abbey church survives as the parish church of Mozac.

Buildings and contents
Romanesque capitals with figurative carvings of high quality survive in some quantity, and the church still contains some elements of Romanesque architecture.

The relics of Saint Austremonius are still preserved here, as are those of the founder Saint Calminius, in a chasse reliquary shrine (illustrations of details) which is the largest extant reliquary in mediaeval Limoges enamel in the world.

List of abbots of Mozac

Elected by the community

 About 681: Euterius
 8th century: Lanfred I
 8th century: Lanfred II
 End of the 9th century: Mansion
 9th century: Robert
 About 950: Stephen I
 11th century: Gerald
 About 1061: Peter I
 About 1095: Eustache I de Guignes
 About 1102: Hugues de Semur
 In 1131 and 1147: Eustache II de Montboissier
 In 1168 and 1181: Pierre III de Marsac
 In 1195 and 1197: Guillaume I de Bromont
 About 1205: Eustorge
 About 1212: Géronte de la Tour
 In 1217 and 1243: Aymeric de Mercœur
 About 1245: Pierre IV de Chazelas
 1252 - 1267: Pierre V d'Ysserpans
 In 1267 and 1269: Aymon I de Vergy
 In 1277 and 1284: Pierre VI de la Ferté-Chauderon
 In 1284 and 1286: Aymon II Brun
 1286 - 1294: Guillaume II de Saint-Saturnin
 1294 - 1309: Pierre VII de Vallière
 1318 - 1343: Guy de Grézolles
 1343 - 1349: Jean I de Saint-Sernin
 In 1350 and 1352: Bernard de Tranchelyon
 In 1361 and 1377 : Étienne de Cottet
 In 1380 and 1406: Jean II de Laqueuille
 1406 - 1419: Philibert d'Archimbaud
 1420 - 1424: Philibert de l'Espinasse
 1424 - 1458: Louis I de Banson
 1459 - 1470: Raymond de Marcenat
 1479 - 1509: Jean III de Marcenat
 1510 - 1515: Louis II de Chassaigne

Commendatory abbots
 1516 - 1524 : Claude Duprat
 1524–1528 : Thomas Duprat
 1529–1560 : Guillaume Duprat
 1568–1570 : Sébastien de l'Aubespine
 1571–1610 : Nicolas de Neuville de Villeroy
 1613–1640 : Antoine Rigoulet
 1641–1655 : Camille de Neuville de Villeroy
 1655–1705 : François d'Albon
 1705–1719 : Joseph-Michel Archon
 1720–1736 : François Ferrand de Cossey (or d'Escossay)
 1739–1764 : Louis-Charles Baudouin
 1764–1789 : Jean Fau de Raze

Notes

References
 Bonnet, Jean, 1938. L'abbaye royale de Mozac en Auvergne.
 Craplet, Bernard, and Granet, Jean, 2002 (re-print). Abbatiale Saint-Pierre Mozac, Éditions Gaud.
 Craplet, Bernard, 1972. Auvergne romane, (4th ed.), pp. 121 – 129. Éditions Zodiaque.
 Gomot, Hippolyte, 1872. Histoire de l'abbaye royale de Mozat.
 Hénault, Denis, 2005. Le site monastique de Mozac au Moyen Âge (VIIe-XVe siècle): Étude historique, archéologique et spatiale (master's thesis). Clermont-Ferrand: Université Blaise-Pascal.
 Joly, Anne, 2001. Temporel d'une abbaye auvergnate au Moyen Âge : Mozac (1095-1560) (master's thesis). Clermont-Ferrand: Université Blaise-Pascal.
 Perona, Matthieu, 2004. L'abbaye royale des bénédictins de Mozat au Moyen Âge (Histoire, vie monastique et architecture de 533 à 1516). Éditions Club Historique Mozacois.

External links

  Federation of Cluniac Sites
  Romanes.com : Photographs of the Romanesque capitals
  Mozac sculptures
  CÉSAM (Comité d'études et de soutien à l'abbaye de Mozac): Friends of Mozac Abbey

Cluniac monasteries in France
Buildings and structures in Puy-de-Dôme
Romanesque architecture in France
Churches in Puy-de-Dôme